Gauna pyralodes is a species of snout moth in the genus Gauna. It was described by George Hampson in 1916 and is known from western Africa.

Little is known about this moth. It is small and cryptic, with the characteristic snout of the family Pyralidae.  Its habitat, lifestyle and ecology have not been studied.

References

Moths described in 1916
Pyralini
Insects of West Africa
Moths of Africa